The 1924–25 City Cup was the twenty-seventh edition of the City Cup, a cup competition in Northern Irish football.

The tournament was won by Queen's Island for the 3rd time and 3rd consecutive year. They defeated Glentoran 3–2 in a second test match replay at Solitude after both teams finished level on points in the group standings.

Group standings

Test match

Replay

Second replay

References

1924–25 in Northern Ireland association football